The 1969 Tulsa Golden Hurricane football team represented the University of Tulsa during the 1969 NCAA University Division football season. In their first and only year under head coach Vince Carillot, the Golden Hurricane compiled a 1–9 record, 1–4 against conference opponents, and finished in last place in the Missouri Valley Conference.

The team's statistical leaders included Rick Arrington with 1,641 passing yards, Josh Ashton with 851 rushing yards, and Jim Butler with 593 receiving yards.

Schedule

Roster

References

Tulsa
Tulsa Golden Hurricane football seasons
Tulsa Golden Hurricane football